Violet McBride  (born 16 October 1954) is a former women's field hockey player from Northern Ireland who represented both Ireland and Great Britain at international level. She represented Great Britain at the 1988 Summer Olympics. In 2011 she was inducted into the Irish Hockey Association Hall of Fame. McBride is also a former drum major World champion, winning the title in both 1980 and 1982. McBride has also represented Ireland as a senior ladies golfer.

Early years, family and education
McBride was raised in Kilkeel, County Down. She is the daughter of Henry and Dorothy McBride. She has two brothers, Alan and Harry. She was educated at Kilkeel High School.

Domestic teams
While attending Kilkeel High School, McBride played field hockey on Saturday mornings for the school and for Portadown Ladies in the afternoon. She also represented Ulster at interprovincial level. In 2001–02 McBride played for the first official Pegasus veterans team and finished the season as player of the year.

International

Ireland
McBride made 38 senior appearances for Ireland. 
 In 1981, along with Jenny Givan, she was banned from playing for Ireland for six years by the Irish Ladies Hockey Union after opting to play for Great Britain. In 2011 McBride was inducted into the Irish Hockey Association Hall of Fame.

Great Britain
McBride made 64 senior appearances for Great Britain. While playing for Great Britain, she was named the team's Player of the Year for 1987. She represented Great Britain at the 1988 Summer Olympics and captained the team in the bronze medal match against the Netherlands.

Drum major
McBride is also a former drum major World champion, winning the title in both 1980 and 1982. She was the first ever woman to win the title. She has also won Ulster, All-Ireland, British, European, Cowal and Scottish championships. Her brother, Alan, was also a Drum major World champion, winning five titles in 1985, 1991, 1995, 1997 and 1999.

Golf
McBride has also represented Ireland as a senior ladies golfer. She plays for Belvoir Park Golf Club. She is also a lifetime honorary member at her local club in Kilkeel.

References

External links
 

1954 births
Living people
Olympic field hockey players of Great Britain
Field hockey players at the 1988 Summer Olympics
Ireland international women's field hockey players
Female field hockey players from Northern Ireland
Irish female field hockey players
British female field hockey players
Female field hockey midfielders
Irish female golfers
Female golfers from Northern Ireland
Sportspeople from County Down
People educated at Kilkeel High School
People from Kilkeel
Members of the Order of the British Empire